Equilibrium dissociation constant refers to:

 Dissociation constant
 Equilibrium constant